George Washington Hopkins (February 22, 1804 – March 1, 1861) was a nineteenth-century United States politician, diplomat, lawyer, judge and teacher.

Biography
Born in Goochland County, Virginia near Goochland Court House to the Episcopal minister Charles Hopkins, Hopkins attended the common schools as a child. He later taught school, studied law and was admitted to the bar in 1834, commencing practice in Lebanon, Virginia. He was a member of the Virginia House of Delegates from 1833 to 1835 and was elected a Jacksonian Democrat and Conservative to the United States House of Representatives in 1834, serving from 1835 to 1847. There, Hopkins served as chairman of the Committee on Post Office and Post Roads from 1843 to 1847.

President James Knox Polk appointed Hopkins as Chargé d'affaires to Portugal in 1847; he served as until 1849. He returned to the House of Delegates as Speaker succeeding his brother Henry L. Hopkins from 1850–1852 and was a member of the Virginia Constitutional Convention in 1850 and 1851. He served as judge of the circuit court of Washington, D.C. and other counties and was elected back to the House of Representatives in 1856, serving again from 1857 to 1859. There, he served as chairman of the Committee on Foreign Affairs from 1857 to 1859. He was not a candidate for reelection in 1858 and resumed practicing law in Abingdon, Virginia.

Hopkins served in the House of Delegates for a third time from 1859 until his death in Richmond, Virginia on March 1, 1861. He was interred in Sinking Spring Cemetery in Abingdon.

References

External links

1804 births
1861 deaths
Speakers of the Virginia House of Delegates
Virginia lawyers
Ambassadors of the United States to Portugal
Politicians from Abingdon, Virginia
People from Goochland County, Virginia
Conservative Party of Virginia members of the United States House of Representatives
19th-century American diplomats
Jacksonian members of the United States House of Representatives from Virginia
Democratic Party members of the United States House of Representatives from Virginia
19th-century American politicians
Virginia circuit court judges